Oleksandr Yevheniyovych Nazarenko (born 1 February 2000) is a Ukrainian professional footballer who plays as a midfielder for Dnipro-1.

Career
Nazarenko is a product of the Dnipro academy.

He started to play for FC Dnipro in the UPL U-21 competitions in 2017 just before the club was relegation due to sanctions. Nazarenko made his debut for the club's senior squad in the Ukrainian Second League in the match against FC Real Pharma Odesa on 15 July 2017 in a 1–2 away loss.

At the end of the 2017–18 Ukrainian Second League Nazarenko moved to the newly created SC Dnipro-1. The next season 2018–19 already in the Ukrainian First League he was recognized as a player of the month for September.

Career statistics

References

External links

2000 births
Living people
Footballers from Dnipro
Ukrainian footballers
FC Dnipro players
SC Dnipro-1 players
Ukrainian Premier League players
Ukrainian First League players
Ukrainian Second League players
Ukraine youth international footballers
Association football midfielders
Ukraine under-21 international footballers
Dnipro Academy people